Elliott Browne (10 October 1847 – 10 March 1915) was an English cricketer. He played four matches for Gloucestershire in 1872. His brother Gerald was also a first-class cricketer.

References

1847 births
1915 deaths
English cricketers
Gloucestershire cricketers
People from Goldington